Ataullah Mengal (24 March 1929 – 2 September 2021) was a Pakistani politician and feudal figure. He was the head of the Mengal tribe until he nominated one of his grandsons, Sardar Asad Ullah Mengal, as his tribal successor. He was also the 1st Chief Minister of Balochistan during Zulfikar Ali Bhutto's premiership from 1 May 1972 to 13 February 1973. He died on 2 September 2021 in Karachi.

Early life
Ataullah Mengal was born on 24 March 1929 in Wadh Tehsil and spent most of his childhood in Lasbela before moving to Karachi, Sindh. He was declared the chief (sardar) of the Mengal tribe in 1954.

Career in politics
Mengal was introduced to politics by Mir Ghaus Baksh Bizenjo. Bizenjo ran the election campaign of Mengal and Mengal was later elected to the West Pakistan provincial assembly in 1962. As a member of the legislature, Mengal was critical of the Ayub Khan regime and their One Unit Scheme; one of his speeches against them led to his arrest on charges of sedition.

In May 1972, he was elected to the Provincial Assembly of the Balochistan. During this time, Mengal became the first chief minister of Balochistan. During the brief tenure in office, tax reforms were instituted and a new police force was formed in Balochistan. Freedom of speech and of the press were encouraged and, in the words of Bizenjo, the governor at the time, Balochistan became "an island of freedom in a sea of political inequalities". Mengal was dismissed by the then Prime Minister Zulfikar Ali Bhutto in February 1973; one day after Bhutto took office, Mengal, Bizenjo and other local leaders were arrested by the Bhutto government.

Mengal was not released from prison until after General Muhammad Zia-ul-Haq's 1977 military coup. He chose to go into a self-exile in London during Zia-ul-Haq's rule.  On 31 March 1985, he participated in the founding of Sindhi–Baloch–Pashtun Front there.

In the late 1990s, Ataullah Mengal returned to Pakistan and formed the Balochistan National Party (BNP). Mengal-led BNP emerged as one of the largest parliamentary group during the general elections in Pakistan. Mengal's son, Akhtar Mengal (b. 1962), then became the Chief Minister of Balochistan in a coalition government with support from the Jamhoori Wattan Party (JWP). Ataullah was elected in 1998 to become party chief of BNP, but the disputed results prompted the departure of several key party members.

In the 1990s, Mengal was also the head of Pakistan Oppressed Nations Movement (Ponm).

In 2009, Sardar Ataullah Khan Mengal was one of many candidates considered for the position of President of Pakistan after the resignation of Pervez Musharraf. He was also considered for the post of interim prime minister in 2012 and president of Pakistan in 2013, but he declined the offers.

Mengal's active participation in politics of Pakistan declined because of his advance age and health issues.

Death and burial
Mengal died in Karachi, Sindh on 2 September 2021 due to cardiac arrest. He had had cardiovascular disease. A Balochistan National Party (BNP) spokesman confirmed his death and announced that Mengal will be buried in his ancestral graveyard in Wadh, Khuzdar District. Many Pakistani politicians including the President of Pakistan, Arif Alvi, and the Chief Minister of Balochistan, Jam Kamal Khan, expressed their condolences over the death of the veteran Pakistani politician. The Chief Minister of Sindh, Murad Ali Shah, and the Speaker of Balochistan assembly, Mir Abdul Quddus Bizenjo, also expressed their condolences over the death of Mengal.

Pakistan Peoples Party chairman, Bilawal Bhutto Zardari, and Jamiat Ulema-e-Islam (F) chief, Fazlur Rehman, also expressed their profound grief and sorrow at the death of the veteran politician.
On 3 September, his body was buried in his native town Wadh in Khuzdar District of Balochistan.

See also 
Mengal
Khan Wali Khan
Mir Gul Khan Naseer
Mir Ghaus Baksh Bizenjo
National Awami Party
Balochistan National Party
List of political parties in Pakistan

References

External links 
 Rahman, Shamimur. "Nothing but provincial autonomy" DAWN Magazine, 12 February 2006. Last accessed on 21-02-06
 

1929 births
2021 deaths
Baloch people
Chief Ministers of Balochistan, Pakistan
Tumandars
Ataullah
Pakistani political party founders
People from Khuzdar District